In Operation is the first live DVD from Hard-Fi, filmed at London's historic Astoria venue and the full live performance, during their sold out 15 date UK tour in December 2005. The CD/DVD reached #62 in the UK Album Chart.

History
The performance, in front of an ecstatic hometown crowd, features all the tracks on Hard-Fi's 750,000 selling, #1 debut album Stars Of CCTV, at the time brand new track "You And Me", which would go on to appear as a B-side to "Suburban Knights", and the band's version of "Seven Nation Army" by The White Stripes – a massive crowd favourite. It also comes backed with CCTVersions – an exclusive CD which features dubbed versions of album tracks, produced by a host of guests including Roots Manuva and Wrongtom.

Additional footage includes all the Hard-Fi videos, from April 2005's "Tied Up Too Tight" through to "Better Do Better". There is also behind the scenes footage from the making of each video plus the Stars of CCTV EPK and mini-documentary 'In Operation' – a Channel 4 special on the band. There's also a host of hidden content on the DVD, including 2004's rarely seen, original video for "Cash Machine" which saw the band dodging security to vault the perimeter fence at Heathrow airport to film just feet from the main runway, all the band's videos and exclusive behind the scenes footage.

Q magazine gave it four stars saying, "Slick, suburban escapism, live in your front room, Archer's anthems skilfully balance passion and craft".

Track listing

Disc One - DVD
Live at the Astoria
The Man With a Harmonica / Middle Eastern Holiday
Gotta Reason
Unnecessary Trouble
Better Do Better
Tied Up Too Tight
Feltham Is Singing Out
You and Me
Seven Nation Army
Cash Machine
Hard to Beat
Move On Now
Stars of CCTV
Living for the Weekend

CCTV Videos
Stars of CCTV
Cash Machine [Original Version]
Cash Machine [ATM Version]
Cash Machine [On Set]
Tied Up Too Tight
Hard to Beat
Hard to Beat [On Set]
Living for the Weekend
Living for the Weekend [On Set]
Better Do Better
Better Do Better [On Set]
Photo Gallery
In Operation [Channel 4 Featurette]

Disc Two - CCTVersions
Cash Machine [Roots Manuva Dub Remix]
Cash Converter [Dub Machine Part 2]
Better Dub Better [Wolsey White Dub]
Middle Eastern Holiday [Wrongtom Meets The Rockers East of Medina Dub]
Living For The Weekend [Wolsey White & Fred Dub]
Seven Nation Army
Dub of CCTV [Wolsey White Dub]
Better Do Better [Wrongtom Wild Inna 81 Version]
Dubbed Up Too Tight
Move On Dub

References

Hard-Fi albums
2006 compilation albums
2006 video albums
2006 remix albums
2006 live albums
Music video compilation albums
Live video albums
Warner Music Group live albums
Warner Music Group video albums
Warner Music Group remix albums
Warner Music Group compilation albums